Don't Sleep is a 2017 American fantasy horror film written and directed by Rick Bieber and starring Dominic Sherwood, Charlbi Dean, Jill Hennessy, Drea de Matteo, Alex Rocco in his final film before his death in 2015 and Cary Elwes.

Cast
Drea de Matteo as Jo Marino
Cary Elwes as Dr. Richard Sommers
Dominic Sherwood as Zach Bradford
Charlbi Dean as Shawn Edmon
Jill Hennessy as Cindy Bradford
Alex Rocco as Mr. Marino

Reception
The film has a 9% rating on Rotten Tomatoes, based on eleven reviews with an average rating of 4.39/10. Jeffrey M. Anderson of Common Sense Media awarded the film one star out of five. Simon Abrams of RogerEbert.com awarded the film two stars.

References

External links
 
 

American fantasy films
2017 horror films
American horror films
2010s English-language films
2010s American films